Hugh Talmage Lefler (1901 – 1981) was a historian known for his work on the history of North Carolina. 

He was born in Cooleemee, North Carolina, and grew up on a farm in Davie County.

He taught at the University of North Carolina for many years and authored a number of books. His book The Growth of North Carolina was used as the standard state history textbook in North Carolina public schools. His book North Carolina, History of a Southern State was the leading text on the subject. Author Sam Ragan, writing in the North Carolina Historical Review, wrote that Lefler "made history come alive in the classroom and in his books." He held historical views that are typical of the Lost Cause, such as the highly questionable at best view that the American Civil War was not necessarily fought over slavery, writing that "... there were other reasons for the [Civil] war than the question of slavery extension."

A historical marker commemorating him and his work is located a mile from his former home. The University of North Carolina has a collection of his papers.

Selected bibliography
North Carolina History Told to Contemporaries (1934)
Hinton Rowan Helper, Advocate of White America, Historical Publishing, 1935
The Growth of North Carolina (1940)A Plea for Federal Union, University Press of Virginia, 1947, editor
 The Papers of Walter Clark, University of North Carolina Press, 1948, editorThe United States, Ronald, 1950
A Documentary History of the University of North Carolina (1953)Orange Country, 1752, Orange Printshop, 1953, editorNorth Carolina The History Of A Southern State (1954) with Albert Ray NewsomeGuide to the Study and Reading of North Carolina History (1955)History of North Carolina (1956)
 Travels in the Old South, University of Oklahoma Press, editor (1956)Colonial America, with Oscar Theodore Barck Jr., Macmillan, (1958, second edition 1968)America, Land of Freedom, Heath, (1959)North Carolina (1959)A History of the United States'', Meridian, (1960)

References

American historians
Historians of North Carolina
20th-century American historians
American male non-fiction writers
1981 deaths
1901 births
20th-century American male writers
University of North Carolina faculty